Diego Guzmán de Silva (Ciudad Rodrigo, c. 1520 - Venice, 1577) was a Spanish canon and diplomat. He served as ambassador to England (then under Elizabeth I), the Republic of Genoa and the Republic of Venice.

References

1520 births
1577 deaths
People from Ciudad Rodrigo
Ambassadors of Spain to the Republic of Venice
Ambassadors of Spain to England
Ambassadors to the Republic of Genoa
16th-century Spanish diplomats